Hardin County Line is the debut album of American country music singer-songwriter Mark Collie.  It featured 4 singles, two of which, "Looks Aren't Everything" & "Let Her Go", hit the top 40.  The other two, the title track and "Something With A Ring To It" failed to chart.  The album itself reached a peak of number 57.

The track, "Something with a Ring to It" would later be recorded by Garth Brooks and included as a bonus track on The Chase for The Limited Series and would be included on all later pressings of that album. "Where There's Smoke" was later released as a single by Archer/Park in 1994.

Critical reception

Giving it 4.5 out of 5 stars, John Floyd of AllMusic wrote that the album "evokes the heart of '50s country, with detailed and compassionate songwriting, wildcat vocals, and guitar by James Burton."

Track listing

Personnel
From Hardin County Line liner notes.

Musicians
Eddie Bayers - drums
Barry Beckett - piano
James Burton - electric guitar
The Fairfield Five Singers - background vocals on "What I Wouldn't Give"
Paul Franklin - steel guitar
Vince Gill - background vocals
Mac McAnally - acoustic guitar
Steve Nathan - organ on "Deliver Me" and "Another Old Soldier"
Michael Rhodes - bass guitar
Harry Stinson - background vocals
Marty Stuart - acoustic guitar on "Hardin County Line"
Curtis Young - background vocals

Technical
Milan Bogdan - digital editing
David Boyer - engineering
Tony Brown - producer
Doug Johnson - producer, recording, mixing
Brad Jones - engineering
Julian King - engineering
Tim Kish - engineering
Linell - engineering
Glenn Meadows - mastering
Keith Odle - engineering

Chart performance

References

1990 debut albums
Mark Collie albums
Albums produced by Tony Brown (record producer)
MCA Records albums
Albums produced by Doug Johnson (record producer)